This is a list of published International Organization for Standardization (ISO) standards and other deliverables. For a complete and up-to-date list of all the ISO standards, see the ISO catalogue.

The standards are protected by copyright and most of them must be purchased. However, about 300 of the standards produced by ISO and IEC's Joint Technical Committee 1 (JTC 1) have been made freely and publicly available.

ISO 14000 – ISO 14999
 ISO 14000 Environmental management systems (This is a set of standards, rather than a single standard)
 ISO 14001:2015 Environmental management systems – Requirements with guidance for use
 ISO 14004:2016 Environmental management systems – General guidelines on implementation
 ISO 14005:2010 Environmental management systems – Guidelines for the phased implementation of an environmental management system, including the use of environmental performance evaluation
 ISO 14006:2011 Environmental management systems – Guidelines for incorporating ecodesign
 ISO 14015:2022 Environmental management — Guidelines for environmental due diligence assessment
 ISO 14020:2000 Environmental labels and declarations – General principles
 ISO 14031 Environmental management - Environmental performance evaluation – Guidelines
 ISO 14046:2014 - Environmental management — Water footprint — Principles, requirements and guidelines
 ISO 14050:2009 Environmental management – Vocabulary
 ISO 14051 Environmental management – Material flow cost accounting - General framework
 ISO 14064 Greenhouse gases
 ISO/TR 14073:2017 Environmental management - Water footprint - Illustrative examples on how to apply ISO 14046
 ISO 14084 Process diagrams for power plants
 ISO 14084-1:2015 Part 1: Specification for diagrams
 ISO 14084-2:2015 Part 2: Graphical symbols
 ISO/TS 14101:2012 Surface characterization of gold nanoparticles for nanomaterial specific toxicity screening: FT-IR method
 ISO/IEC 14102:2008 Information technology - Guideline for the evaluation and selection of CASE tools
 ISO/TR 14105:2011 Document management - Change management for successful electronic document management system (EDMS) implementation
 ISO 14117:2012 Active implantable medical devices – Electromagnetic compatibility – EMC test protocols for implantable cardiac pacemakers, implantable cardioverter defibrillators and cardiac resynchronization devices
 ISO 14132 Optics and photonics - Vocabulary for telescopic systems
 ISO 14132-1:2015 Part 1: General terms and alphabetical indexes of terms in ISO 14132
 ISO 14132-2:2015 Part 2: Terms for binoculars, monoculars and spotting scopes
 ISO 14132-3:2014 Part 3: Terms for telescopic sights
 ISO 14132-4:2015 Part 4: Terms for astronomical telescopes
 ISO 14132-5:2008 Part 5: Terms for night vision devices
 ISO/IEC 14136:1995 Information technology – Telecommunications and information exchange between systems – Private Integrated Services Network – Specification, functional model and information flows – Identification supplementary services
 ISO 14139:2000 Hydrometric determinations – Flow measurements in open channels using structures – Compound gauging structures
 ISO/IEC 14143 Information technology - Software measurement - Functional size measurement
 ISO/IEC 14143-1:2007 Part 1: Definition of concepts
 ISO/IEC 14143-2:2011 Part 2: Conformity evaluation of software size measurement methods to ISO/IEC 14143-1
 ISO/IEC TR 14143-3:2003 Part 3: Verification of functional size measurement methods
 ISO/IEC TR 14143-4:2002 Part 4: Reference model
 ISO/IEC TR 14143-5:2004 Part 5: Determination of functional domains for use with functional size measurement
 ISO/IEC 14143-6:2012 Part 6: Guide for use of ISO/IEC 14143 series and related International Standards
 ISO 14145 Roller ball pens and refills
 ISO 14145-2:1998 Part 2: Documentary use (DOC)
 ISO 14155:2011 Clinical investigation of medical devices for human subjects – Good clinical practice
 ISO 14163:1998 Acoustics – Guidelines for noise control by silencers
 ISO 14164:1999 Stationary source emissions – Determination of the volume flowrate of gas streams in ducts – Automated method
 ISO/IEC 14165 Information technology - Fibre Channel
 ISO/IEC 14165-114:2005 Part 114: 100 MB/s Balanced copper physical interface (FC-100-DF-EL-S)
 ISO/IEC 14165-115:2006 Part 115: Physical Interfaces (FC-PI)
 ISO/IEC 14165-116:2005 Part 116: 10 Gigabit (10GFC)
 ISO/IEC TR 14165-117:2007 Part 117: Methodologies for jitter and signal quality (MJSQ)
 ISO/IEC 14165-122:2005 Part 122: Arbitrated Loop-2 (FC-AL-2)
 ISO/IEC 14165-131:2000 Part 131: Switch Fabric Requirements (FC-SW)
 ISO/IEC 14165-133:2010 Part 133: Switch Fabric-3 (FC-SW-3)
 ISO/IEC 14165-141:2001 Part 141: Fabric Generic Requirements (FC-FG)
 ISO/IEC 14165-211:1999 Part 211: Mapping to HIPPI-FP (FC-FP)
 ISO/IEC 14165-222:2005 Part 222: Single-byte command code 2 mapping protocol (FC-SB-2)
 ISO/IEC 14165-241:2005 Part 241: Backbone 2 (FC-BB-2)
 ISO/IEC 14165-243:2012 Part 243: Backbone 3 (FC-BB-3)
 ISO/IEC 14165-251:2008 Part 251: Framing and Signaling (FC-FS)
 ISO/IEC TR 14165-312:2009 Part 312: Avionics environment upper layer protocol MIL-STD-1553B Notice 2 (FC-AE-1553)
 ISO/IEC TR 14165-313:2013 Part 313: Avionics Environment—Anonymous Synchronous Messaging (FC-AE-ASM)
 ISO/IEC TR 14165-314:2013 Part 314: Avionics Environment – Remote Direct Memory Access (FC-AE-RDMA)
 ISO/IEC 14165-321:2009 Part 321: Audio-Video (FC-AV)
 ISO/IEC 14165-331:2007 Part 331: Virtual Interface (FC-VI)
 ISO/IEC TR 14165-372:2011 Part 372: Methodologies of interconnects-2 (FC-MI-2)
 ISO/IEC 14165-414:2007 Part 414: Generic Services—4 (FC-GS-4)
 ISO/IEC 14165-521:2009 Part 521: Fabric application interface standard (FAIS)
 ISO/IEC 14169:1995 Information technology – 90 mm flexible disk cartridges – 21 MBytes formatted capacity – ISO Type 305
 ISO 14189:2013 Water quality – Enumeration of Clostridium perfringens – Method using membrane filtration
 ISO 14199:2015 Health informatics – Information models – Biomedical Research Integrated Domain Group (BRIDG) Model
 ISO 14223  identification of animals – Advanced transponders
 ISO 14224 Petroleum, petrochemical and natural gas industries - Collection and exchange of reliability and maintenance data for equipment
 ISO 14230 Road vehicles – Diagnostic systems – Keyword Protocol 2000
 ISO 14242 Implants for surgery – Wear of total hip-joint prostheses
 ISO 14242-1:2014 Part 1: Loading and displacement parameters for wear-testing machines and corresponding environmental conditions for test
 ISO 14242-2:2016 Part 2: Methods of measurement
 ISO 14242-3:2009 Part 3: Loading and displacement parameters for orbital bearing type wear testing machines and corresponding environmental conditions for test
 ISO 14243 Implants for surgery – Wear of total knee-joint prostheses
 ISO 14243-1:2009 Part 1: Loading and displacement parameters for wear-testing machines with load control and corresponding environmental conditions for test
 ISO 14243-2:2016 Part 2: Methods of measurement
 ISO 14243-3:2014 Part 3: Loading and displacement parameters for wear-testing machines with displacement control and corresponding environmental conditions for test
 ISO/IEC 14251:1995 Information technology – Data interchange on 12,7 mm 36-track magnetic tape cartridges
 ISO/IEC TR 14252:1996 Information technology - Guide to the POSIX Open System Environment (OSE) [Withdrawn without replacement]
 ISO 14253 Geometrical product specifications (GPS) - Inspection by measurement of workpieces and measuring equipment
 ISO 14253-1:2013 Part 1: Decision rules for proving conformity or nonconformity with specifications
 ISO 14253-2:2011 Part 2: Guidance for the estimation of uncertainty in GPS measurement, in calibration of measuring equipment and in product verification
 ISO 14253-3:2011 Part 3: Guidelines for achieving agreements on measurement uncertainty statements
 ISO/TS 14253-4:2010 Part 4: Background on functional limits and specification limits in decision rules
 ISO 14253-5:2015 Part 5: Uncertainty in verification testing of indicating measuring instruments
 ISO/TR 14253-6:2012 Part 6: Generalized decision rules for the acceptance and rejection of instruments and workpieces
 ISO/TS 14265:2011 Health Informatics – Classification of purposes for processing personal health information
 ISO/TR 14283:2004 Implants for surgery – Fundamental principles
 ISO 14289 Document management applications - Electronic document file format enhancement for accessibility
 ISO 14289-1:2014 Part 1: Use of ISO 32000-1 (PDF/UA-1)
 ISO/TR 14292:2012 Health informatics – Personal health records – Definition, scope and context
 ISO 14296:2016 Intelligent transport systems – Extension of map database specifications for applications of cooperative ITS
 ISO 14302:2002 Space systems – Electromagnetic compatibility requirements
 ISO 14362 Textiles - Methods for determination of certain aromatic amines derived from azo colorants
 ISO 14362-1:2017 Part 1: Detection of the use of certain azo colorants accessible with and without extracting the fibres
 ISO 14362-3:2017 Part 3: Detection of the use of certain azo colorants, which may release 4-aminoazobenzene
 ISO/IEC TR 14369:2018 Information technology – Programming languages, their environments and system software interfaces – Guidelines for the preparation of language-independent service specifications (LISS)
 ISO 14405 Geometrical product specifications (GPS) – Dimensional tolerancing
 ISO 14405-1:2016 Part 1: Linear sizes
 ISO 14405-2:2011 Part 2: Dimensions other than linear sizes
 ISO 14405-3:2016 Part 3: Angular sizes
 ISO 14406:2010 Geometrical product specifications (GPS) - Extraction
 ISO 14408:2016 Tracheal tubes designed for laser surgery – Requirements for marking and accompanying information
 ISO 14416:2003 Information and documentation – Requirements for binding of books, periodicals, serials and other paper documents for archive and library use – Methods and materials
 ISO/IEC 14417:1999 Information technology – Data recording format DD-1 for magnetic tape cassette conforming to IEC 1016
 ISO/TS 14441:2013 Health informatics – Security and privacy requirements of EHR systems for use in conformity assessment
 ISO/IEC 14443 Identification cards – Contactless integrated circuit cards – Proximity cards
 ISO 14451 Pyrotechnic articles – Pyrotechnic articles for vehicles
 ISO 14451-1:2013 Part 1: Terminology
 ISO 14452:2012 Network services billing – Requirements
 ISO 14461 Milk and milk products – Quality control in microbiological laboratories
 ISO 14461-1:2005 Part 1: Analyst performance assessment for colony counts
 ISO 14461-2:2005 Part 2: Determination of the reliability of colony counts of parallel plates and subsequent dilution steps
 ISO/IEC 14462:2010 Information technology - Open-edi reference model
 ISO/TR 14468:2010 Selected illustrations of attribute agreement analysis
 ISO/IEC TR 14471:2007 Information technology - Software engineering - Guidelines for the adoption of CASE tools
 ISO/IEC 14473:1999 Information technology - Office equipment - Minimum information to be specified for image scanners
 ISO/IEC 14474:1998 Information technology – Telecommunications and information exchange between systems – Private Integrated Services Network – Functional requirements for static circuit-mode inter-PINX connections
 ISO/IEC TR 14475:2001 Information technology – Telecommunications and information exchange between systems – Private Integrated Services Network – Architecture and scenarios for Private Integrated Services Networking
 ISO/IEC 14476 Information technology – Enhanced communications transport protocol
 ISO/IEC 14476-1:2002 Specification of simplex multicast transport
 ISO/IEC 14476-2:2003 Specification of QoS management for simplex multicast transport
 ISO/IEC 14476-3:2008 Specification of duplex multicast transport
 ISO/IEC 14476-4:2010 Specification of QoS management for duplex multicast transport
 ISO/IEC 14476-5:2008 Specification of N-plex multicast transport
 ISO/IEC 14476-6:2010 Specification of QoS management for n-plex multicast transport
 ISO/IEC 14478 Information technology - Computer graphics and image processing - Presentation Environment for Multimedia Objects (PREMO)
 ISO/IEC 14478-1:1998 Part 1: Fundamentals of PREMO
 ISO/IEC 14478-2:1998 Part 2: Foundation Component
 ISO/IEC 14478-3:1998 Part 3: Multimedia Systems Services
 ISO/IEC 14478-4:1998 Part 4: Modelling, rendering and interaction component
 ISO/IEC 14492:2001 Information technology - Lossy/lossless coding of bi-level images
 ISO/IEC 14495 Information technology - Lossless and near-lossless compression of continuous-tone still images
 ISO/IEC 14495-1:1999 Baseline
 ISO/IEC 14495-2:2003 Extensions
 ISO/IEC 14496 Information technology – Coding of audio-visual objects
 ISO 14500:2003 Textile machinery and accessories – Harnesses for Jacquard weaving machines – Vocabulary
 ISO 14509 Small craft – Airborne sound emitted by powered recreational craft
 ISO 14509-1:2008 Part 1: Pass-by measurement procedures
 ISO 14509-3:2009 Part 3: Sound assessment using calculation and measurement procedures
 ISO 14511:2001 Measurement of fluid flow in closed conduits – Thermal mass flowmeters
 ISO/IEC 14515 Information technology - Portable Operating System Interface (POSIX®) - Test methods for measuring conformance to POSIX
 ISO/IEC 14515-1:2000 Part 1: System interfaces
 ISO/IEC TR 14516:2002 Information technology - Security techniques - Guidelines for the use and management of Trusted Third Party services
 ISO/IEC 14517:1996 Information technology - 130 mm optical disk cartridges for information interchange - Capacity: 2,6 Gbytes per cartridge
 ISO/IEC 14519:2001 Information technology - POSIX Ada Language Interfaces - Binding for System Application Program Interface (API)
 ISO 14532:2014 Natural gas – Vocabulary
 ISO 14533 Processes, data elements and documents in commerce, industry and administration – Long term signature profiles
 ISO 14533-1:2014 Part 1: Long term signature profiles for CMS Advanced Electronic Signatures (CAdES)
 ISO 14533-2:2012 Part 2: Long term signature profiles for XML Advanced Electronic Signatures (XAdES)
 ISO 14533-3:2017 Part 3: Long term signature profiles for PDF Advanced Electronic Signatures (PAdES)
 ISO 14534:2011 Ophthalmic optics – Contact lenses and contact lens care products – Fundamental requirements
 ISO 14539:2000 Manipulating industrial robots - Object handling with grasp-type grippers - Vocabulary and presentation of characteristics
 ISO/IEC 14543 Information technology – Home Electronic System (HES) architecture
 ISO/IEC 14543-2-1:2006 Part 2-1: Introduction and device modularity
 ISO/IEC 14543-3-1:2006 Part 3-1: Communication layers – Application layer for network based control of HES Class 1
 ISO/IEC 14543-3-2:2006 Part 3-2: Communication layers – Transport, network and general parts of data link layer for network based control of HES Class 1
 ISO/IEC 14543-3-3:2007 Part 3-3: User process for network based control of HES Class 1
 ISO/IEC 14543-3-4:2007 Part 3-4: System management – Management procedures for network based control of HES Class 1
 ISO/IEC 14543-3-5:2007 Part 3-5: Media and media dependent layers – Power line for network based control of HES Class 1
 ISO/IEC 14543-3-6:2007 Part 3-6: Media and media dependent layers – Network based on HES Class 1, twisted pair
 ISO/IEC 14543-3-7:2007 Part 3-7: Media and media dependent layers – Radio frequency for network based control of HES Class 1
 ISO/IEC 14543-3-10:2012 Part 3-10: Wireless short-packet (WSP) protocol optimized for energy harvesting – Architecture and lower layer protocols
 ISO/IEC 14543-3-11:2016 Part 3-11: Frequency modulated wireless short-packet (FMWSP) protocol optimised for energy harvesting – Architecture and lower layer protocols
 ISO/IEC TR 14543-4:2002 Part 4: Home and building automation in a mixed-use building
 ISO/IEC 14543-4-1:2008 Part 4-1: Communication layers – Application layer for network enhanced control devices of HES Class 1
 ISO/IEC 14543-4-2:2008 Part 4-2: Communication layers – Transport, network and general parts of data link layer for network enhanced control devices of HES Class 1
 ISO/IEC 14543-4-3:2015 Part 4-3: Application layer interface to lower communications layers for network enhanced control devices of HES Class 1
 ISO/IEC 14543-5-1:2010 Part 5-1: Intelligent grouping and resource sharing for Class 2 and Class 3 – Core protocol
 ISO/IEC 14543-5-3:2012 Part 5-3: Intelligent grouping and resource sharing for HES Class 2 and Class 3 – Basic application
 ISO/IEC 14543-5-4:2010 Part 5-4: Intelligent grouping and resource sharing for HES Class 2 and Class 3 – Device validation
 ISO/IEC 14543-5-5:2012 Part 5-5: Intelligent grouping and resource sharing for HES Class 2 and Class 3 – Device type
 ISO/IEC 14543-5-6:2012 Part 5-6: Intelligent grouping and resource sharing for HES Class 2 and Class 3 – Service type
 ISO/IEC 14543-5-7:2015 Part 5-7: Intelligent grouping and 3 resource sharing – Remote access system architecture
 ISO/IEC 14543-5-8:2017 Part 5-8: Intelligent grouping and resource sharing for HES Class 2 and Class 3 – Remote access core protocol
 ISO/IEC 14543-5-9:2017 Part 5-9: Intelligent grouping and resource sharing for HES class 2 and class 3 – Remote access service platform
 ISO/IEC 14543-5-21:2012 Part 5-21: Intelligent grouping and resource sharing for HES Class 2 and Class 3 – Application profile – AV profile
 ISO/IEC 14543-5-22:2010 Part 5-22: Intelligent grouping and resource sharing for HES Class 2 and Class 3 – Application profile – File profile
 ISO 14560:2004 Acceptance sampling procedures by attributes - Specified quality levels in nonconforming items per million
 ISO/TR 14564:1995 Shipbuilding and marine structures - Marking of escape routes
 ISO/IEC 14568:1997 Information technology - DXL: Diagram eXchange Language for tree-structured charts
 ISO/IEC 14575:2000 Information technology - Microprocessor systems - Heterogeneous InterConnect (HIC) (Low-Cost, Low-Latency Scalable Serial Interconnect for Parallel System Construction)
 ISO/IEC 14576:1999 Information technology - Synchronous Split Transfer Type System Bus (STbus) - Logical Layer
 ISO 14580:2011 Hexalobular socket cheese head screws
 ISO 14588:2000 Blind rivets - Terminology and definitions
 ISO/IEC 14598 Software engineering - Product evaluation
 ISO/IEC 14598-5:1998 Part 5: Process for evaluators
 ISO/IEC 14598-6:2001 Part 6: Documentation of evaluation modules
 ISO 14602:2010 Non-active surgical implants – Implants for osteosynthesis – Particular requirements
 ISO 14607:2007 Non-active surgical implants – Mammary implants – Particular requirements
 ISO 14617 Graphical symbols for diagrams
 ISO 14617-1:2005 Part 1: General information and indexes
 ISO 14617-2:2002 Part 2: Symbols having general application
 ISO 14617-3:2002 Part 3: Connections and related devices
 ISO 14617-3:2002 Part 3: Connections and related devices
 ISO 14617-4:2002 Part 4: Actuators and related devices
 ISO 14617-5:2002 Part 5: Measurement and control devices
 ISO 14617-6:2002 Part 6: Measurement and control functions
 ISO 14617-7:2002 Part 7: Basic mechanical components
 ISO 14617-8:2002 Part 8: Valves and dampers
 ISO 14617-9:2002 Part 9: Pumps, compressors and fans
 ISO 14617-10:2002 Part 10: Fluid power converters
 ISO 14617-11:2002 Part 11: Devices for heat transfer and heat engines
 ISO 14617-12:2002 Part 12: Devices for separating, purification and mixing
 ISO 14617-13:2004 Part 13: Devices for material processing
 ISO 14617-14:2004 Part 14: Devices for transport and handling of material
 ISO 14617-15:2002 Part 15: Installation diagrams and network maps
 ISO 14630:2012 Non-active surgical implants – General requirements
 ISO 14638:2015 Geometrical product specifications (GPS) - Matrix model
 ISO/TR 14639 Health informatics – Capacity-based eHealth architecture roadmap
 ISO/TR 14639-1:2012 Part 1: Overview of national eHealth initiatives
 ISO/TR 14639-2:2014 Part 2: Architectural components and maturity model
 ISO 14641 Electronic archiving
 ISO 14641-1:2012 Specifications concerning the design and the operation of an information system for electronic information preservation
 ISO 14644 Cleanrooms and associated controlled environments
 ISO/IEC 14651:2020 Information technology — International string ordering and comparison — Method for comparing character strings and description of the common template tailorable ordering
 ISO/IEC 14662:2010 Information technology – Open-edi reference model
 ISO/TR 14685:2001 Hydrometric determinations – Geophysical logging of boreholes for hydrogeological purposes – Considerations and guidelines for making measurements
 ISO 14686:2003 Hydrometric determinations – Pumping tests for water wells – Considerations and guidelines for design, performance and use
 ISO 14695:2003 Industrial fans – Method of measurement of fan vibration
 ISO 14698 Cleanrooms and associated controlled environments – Biocontamination control
 ISO 14698-1:2003 General principles and methods
 ISO 14698-2:2003 Evaluation and interpretation of biocontamination data
 ISO/IEC 14699:1997 Information technology – Open Systems Interconnection – Transport Fast Byte Protocol 
 ISO/IEC 14700:1997 Information technology – Open Systems Interconnection – Network Fast Byte Protocol
 ISO 14708 Implants for surgery – Active implantable medical devices
 ISO 14708-1:2014 Part 1: General requirements for safety, marking and for information to be provided by the manufacturer
 ISO 14708-2:2012 Part 2: Cardiac pacemakers
 ISO 14708-3:2017 Part 3: Implantable neurostimulators
 ISO 14708-4:2008 Part 4: Implantable infusion pumps
 ISO 14708-5:2010 Part 5: Circulatory support devices
 ISO 14708-6:2010 Part 6: Particular requirements for active implantable medical devices intended to treat tachyarrhythmia (including implantable defibrillators)
 ISO 14708-7:2013 Part 7: Particular requirements for cochlear implant systems
 ISO/IEC 14709 Information technology - Configuration of Customer Premises Cabling (CPC) for applications
 ISO/IEC 14709-1:1997 Part 1: Integrated Services Digital Network (ISDN) basic access
 ISO/IEC 14709-2:1998 Part 2: Integrated Services Digital Network (ISDN) primary rate
 ISO 14722:1998 Moped and moped-rider kinematics – Vocabulary
 ISO 14726:2008 Ships and marine technology – Identification colours for the content of piping systems
 ISO 14729:2001 Ophthalmic optics – Contact lens care products – Microbiological requirements and test methods for products and regimens for hygienic management of contact lenses
 ISO 14730:2014 Ophthalmic optics – Contact lens care products – Antimicrobial preservative efficacy testing and guidance on determining discard date
 ISO 14739 Document management - 3D use of Product Representation Compact (PRC) format
 ISO 14739-1:2014 Part 1: PRC 10001
 ISO/TR 14742:2010 Financial services – Recommendations on cryptographic algorithms and their use
 ISO/IEC 14750:1999 Information technology – Open Distributed Processing – Interface Definition Language
 ISO/IEC 14752:2000 Information technology - Open Distributed Processing - Protocol support for computational interactions
 ISO/IEC 14753:1999 Information technology - Open Distributed Processing - Interface references and binding
 ISO/IEC 14754:1999 Information technology – Pen-Based Interfaces – Common gestures for Text Editing with Pen-Based Systems
 ISO/IEC 14755:1997 Information technology – Input methods to enter characters from the repertoire of ISO/IEC 10646 with a keyboard or other input device
 ISO/IEC 14756:1999 Information technology - Measurement and rating of performance of computer-based software systems
 ISO/IEC 14760:1997 Information technology - Data interchange on 90 mm overwritable and read only optical disk cartridges using phase change - Capacity: 1,3 Gbytes per cartridge
 ISO/IEC 14762:2009 Information technology - Functional safety requirements for Home and Building Electronic Systems (HBES)
 ISO/IEC 14763 Information technology - Implementation and operation of customer premises cabling
 ISO/IEC 14763-1:1999 Part 1: Administration
 ISO/IEC 14763-2:2012 Part 2: Planning and installation
 ISO/IEC TR 14763-2-1:2011 Part 2-1: Planning and installation - Identifiers within administration systems
 ISO/IEC 14763-3:2014 Part 3: Testing of optical fibre cabling
 ISO/IEC 14764:2006 Software Engineering - Software Life Cycle Processes - Maintenance
 ISO/IEC 14765:1997 Information technology - Framework for protocol identification and encapsulation
 ISO/IEC 14766:1997 Information technology - Telecommunications and information exchange between systems - Use of OSI applications over the Internet Transmission Control Protocol (TCP)
 ISO/IEC 14769:2001 Information technology - Open Distributed Processing - Type Repository Function
 ISO/IEC 14771:1999 Information technology - Open Distributed Processing - Naming framework
 ISO/IEC 14772 Information technology - Computer graphics and image processing - The Virtual Reality Modeling Language (VRML)
 ISO/IEC 14772-1:1997 Part 1: Functional specification and UTF-8 encoding
 ISO/IEC 14772-2:2004 Part 2: External authoring interface (EAI)
 ISO/IEC 14776 Information technology - Small Computer System Interface (SCSI)
 ISO/IEC 14776-112:2002 Part 112: Parallel Interface-2 (SPI-2)
 ISO/IEC 14776-113:2002 Part 113: Parallel Interface-3 (SPI-3)
 ISO/IEC 14776-115:2004 Part 115: Parallel Interface-5 (SPI-5)
 ISO/IEC 14776-121:2010 Part 121: Passive Interconnect Performance (PIP)
 ISO/IEC 14776-150:2004 Part 150: Serial Attached SCSI (SAS)
 ISO/IEC 14776-151:2010 Part 151: Serial Attached SCSI - 1.1 (SAS-1.1)
 ISO/IEC 14776-153:2015 Part 153: Serial Attached SCSI - 2.1 (SAS-2.1)
 ISO/IEC 14776-154:2017 Part 154: Serial Attached SCSI – 3 (SAS-3)
 ISO/IEC 14776-222:2005 Part 222: Fibre Channel Protocol for SCSI, Second Version (FCP-2)
 ISO/IEC 14776-223:2008 Part 223: Fibre Channel Protocol for SCSI, Third Version (FCP-3)
 ISO/IEC 14776-232:2001 Part 232: Serial Bus Protocol 2 (SBP-2)
 ISO/IEC 14776-251:2014 Part 251: USB attached SCSI (UAS)
 ISO/IEC 14776-261:2012 Part 261: SAS Protocol Layer (SPL)
 ISO/IEC 14776-262:2017 Part 262: SAS protocol layer - 2 (SPL-2)
 ISO/IEC 14776-321:2002 Part 321: SCSI-3 Block Commands (SBC)
 ISO/IEC 14776-322:2007 Part 322: SCSI Block Commands - 2 (SBC-2)
 ISO/IEC 14776-323:2017 Part 323: SCSI Block commands - 3 (SBC-3)
 ISO/IEC 14776-326:2015 Part 326: Reduced block commands (RBC)
 ISO/IEC 14776-331:2002 Part 331: Stream Commands (SSC)
 ISO/IEC 14776-333:2013 Part 333: SCSI Stream Commands - 3 (SSC-3)
 ISO/IEC 14776-341:2000 Part 341: Controller Commands (SCC)
 ISO/IEC 14776-342:2000 Part 342: Controller Commands - 2 (SCC-2)
 ISO/IEC 14776-351:2007 Part 351: Medium Changer Commands (SCSI-3 SMC)
 ISO/IEC 14776-362:2006 Part 362: Multimedia commands-2 (MMC-2)
 ISO/IEC 14776-372:2011 Part 372: SCSI Enclosure Services - 2 (SES-2)
 ISO/IEC 14776-381:2000 Part 381: Optical Memory Card Device Commands (OMC)
 ISO/IEC 14776-411:1999 Part 411: SCSI-3 Architecture Model (SCSI-3 SAM)
 ISO/IEC 14776-412:2006 Part 412: Architecture Model -2 (SAM-2)
 ISO/IEC 14776-413:2007 Part 413: SCSI Architecture Model -3 (SAM-3)
 ISO/IEC 14776-414:2009 Part 414: SCSI Architecture Model-4 (SAM-4)
 ISO/IEC 14776-452:2005 Part 452: SCSI Primary Commands - 2 (SPC-2)
 ISO/IEC 14776-453:2009 Part 453: Primary commands-3 (SPC-3)
 ISO 14785:2014 Tourist information offices – Tourist information and reception services – Requirements
 ISO/TR 14786:2014 Nanotechnologies – Considerations for the development of chemical nomenclature for selected nano-objects
 ISO 14801 Dentistry – Implants – Dynamic fatigue test for endosseous dental implants
 ISO/TR 14806:2013 Intelligent transport systems – Public transport requirements for the use of payment applications for fare media
 ISO 14813 Intelligent transport systems – Reference model architecture(s) for the ITS sector
 ISO 14813-1:2015 Part 1: ITS service domains, service groups and services
 ISO 14813-5:2010 Part 5: Requirements for architecture description in ITS standards
 ISO 14813-6:2009 Part 6: Data presentation in ASN.1
 ISO 14814:2006 Road transport and traffic telematics – Automatic vehicle and equipment identification – Reference architecture and terminology
 ISO 14815:2005 Road transport and traffic telematics – Automatic vehicle and equipment identification – System specifications
 ISO 14816:2005 Road transport and traffic telematics – Automatic vehicle and equipment identification – Numbering and data structure
 ISO 14817 Intelligent transport systems – ITS central data dictionaries
 ISO 14817-1:2015 Part 1: Requirements for ITS data definitions
 ISO 14817-2:2015 Part 2: Governance of the Central ITS Data Concept Registry
 ISO 14817-3:2017 Part 3: Object identifier assignments for ITS data concepts
 ISO 14819 Intelligent transport systems – Traffic and travel information messages via traffic message coding
 ISO 14819-1:2013 Part 1: Coding protocol for Radio Data System – Traffic Message Channel (RDS-TMC) using ALERT-C
 ISO 14819-2:2013 Part 2: Event and information codes for Radio Data System – Traffic Message Channel (RDS-TMC) using ALERT-C
 ISO 14819-3:2013 Part 3: Location referencing for Radio Data System – Traffic Message Channel (RDS-TMC) using ALERT-C
 ISO 14819-6:2006 Part 6: Encryption and conditional access for the Radio Data System – Traffic Message Channel ALERT C coding
 ISO 14823:2017 Intelligent transport systems – Graphic data dictionary
 ISO 14825:2011 Intelligent transport systems – Geographic Data Files (GDF) – GDF5.0
 ISO 14827 Transport information and control systems – Data interfaces between centres for transport information and control systems
 ISO 14827-1:2005 Part 1: Message definition requirements
 ISO 14827-2:2005 Part 2: DATEX-ASN
 ISO/IEC 14833:1996 Information technology – Data interchange on 12,7 mm 128-Track magnetic tape cartridges – DLT 3 format
 ISO/IEC 14834:1996 Information technology - Distributed Transaction Processing - The XA Specification
 ISO 14837 Mechanical vibration – Ground-borne noise and vibration arising from rail systems
 ISO 14837-1:2005 Part 1: General guidance
 ISO/TS 14837-31:2017 Part 31: Guideline on field measurements for the evaluation of human exposure in buildings
 ISO/TS 14837-32:2015 Part 32: Measurement of dynamic properties of the ground
 ISO 14839 Mechanical vibration - Vibration of rotating machinery equipped with active magnetic bearings
 ISO 14839-1:2002 Part 1: Vocabulary
 ISO 14839-2:2004 Part 2: Evaluation of vibration
 ISO 14839-3:2006 Part 3: Evaluation of stability margin
 ISO 14839-4:2012 Part 4: Technical guidelines
 ISO/IEC 14840:1996 Information technology – 12,65 mm wide magnetic tape cartridge for information interchange – Helical scan recording – Data-D3-1 format
 ISO/IEC 14841:1996 Information technology – Telecommunications and information exchange between systems – Private Integrated Services Network – Specification, functional model and information flows – Call offer supplementary service
 ISO/IEC 14842:1996 Information technology – Telecommunications and information exchange between systems – Private Integrated Services Network – Specification, functional model and information flows – Do not disturb and do not disturb override supplementary services
 ISO/IEC 14843:2003 Information technology – Telecommunications and information exchange between systems – Private Integrated Services Network – Inter-exchange signalling protocol – Call Offer supplementary service
 ISO/IEC 14844:2003 Information technology – Telecommunications and information exchange between systems – Private Integrated Services Network – Inter-exchange signalling protocol – Do Not Disturb and Do Not Disturb Override supplementary services
 ISO/IEC 14845:1996 Information technology – Telecommunications and information exchange between systems – Private Integrated Services Network – Specification, functional model and information flows – Call intrusion supplementary service
 ISO/IEC 14846:2003 Information technology – Telecommunications and information exchange between systems – Private Integrated Services Network – Inter-exchange signalling protocol – Call Intrusion supplementary service
 ISO 14855 Determination of the ultimate aerobic biodegradability of plastic materials under controlled composting conditions – Method by analysis of evolved carbon dioxide
 ISO 14855-1:2012 General method
 ISO 14855-2:2007 Gravimetric measurement of carbon dioxide evolved in a laboratory-scale test
 ISO/IEC 14863:1996 Information technology - System-Independent Data Format (SIDF)
 ISO/TR 14873:2013 Information and documentation - Statistics and quality issues for web archiving
 ISO 14879 Implants for surgery – Total knee-joint prostheses
 ISO 14879-1:2000 Part 1: Determination of endurance properties of knee tibial trays
 ISO 14880 Optics and photonics - Microlens arrays
 ISO 14880-1:2016 Part 1: Vocabulary and general properties
 ISO 14880-2:2006 Part 2: Test methods for wavefront aberrations
 ISO 14880-3:2006 Part 3: Test methods for optical properties other than wavefront aberrations
 ISO 14880-4:2006 Part 4: Test methods for geometrical properties
 ISO/TR 14880-5:2010 Part 5: Guidance on testing
 ISO 14881:2001 Integrated optics – Interfaces – Parameters relevant to coupling properties
 ISO/IEC 14882:2020 Programming languages — C++
 ISO/IEC 14888 Information technology - Security techniques - Digital signatures with appendix
 ISO/IEC 14888-1:2008 Part 1: General
 ISO/IEC 14888-2:2008 Part 2: Integer factorization based mechanisms
 ISO/IEC 14888-3:2016 Part 3: Discrete logarithm based mechanisms
 ISO 14889:2013 Ophthalmic optics – Spectacle lenses – Fundamental requirements for uncut finished lenses
 ISO/TS 14904:2002 Road transport and traffic telematics – Electronic fee collection (EFC) – Interface specification for clearing between operators
 ISO 14906:2011 Electronic fee collection – Application interface definition for dedicated short-range communication
 ISO/TS 14907 Electronic fee collection – Test procedures for user and fixed equipment
 ISO/TS 14907-1:2015 Part 1: Description of test procedures
 ISO/TS 14907-2:2016 Part 2: Conformance test for the on-board unit application interface
 ISO/IEC 14908 Information technology - Control network protocol
 ISO/IEC 14908-1:2012 Part 1: Protocol stack
 ISO/IEC 14908-2:2012 Part 2: Twisted pair communication
 ISO/IEC 14908-3:2012 Part 3: Power line channel specification
 ISO/IEC 14908-4:2012 Part 4: IP communication
 ISO 14915 Software ergonomics for multimedia user interfaces
 ISO 14915-1:2002 Part 1: Design principles and framework
 ISO 14915-2:2003 Part 2: Multimedia navigation and control
 ISO 14915-3:2002 Part 3: Media selection and combination
 ISO 14917:2017 Thermal spraying - Terminology, classification
 ISO 14949:2001 Implants for surgery – Two-part addition-cure silicone elastomers
 ISO 14963:2003 Mechanical vibration and shock – Guidelines for dynamic tests and investigations on bridges and viaducts
 ISO 14971:2007 Medical devices – Application of risk management to medical devices
 ISO 14972:1998 Sterile obturators for single use with over-needle peripheral intravascular catheters
 ISO 14975:2000 Surface chemical analysis – Information formats
 ISO 14976:1998 Surface chemical analysis – Data transfer format
 ISO/IEC 14977:1996 Information technology – Syntactic metalanguage – Extended BNF
 ISO 14978:2006 Geometrical product specifications (GPS) – General concepts and requirements for GPS measuring equipment
 ISO 14982:1998 Agricultural and forestry machinery – Electromagnetic compatibility – Test methods and acceptance criteria

ISO 15000 – ISO 15999 

 ISO/TS 15000 Electronic business eXtensible Markup Language ebXML
 ISO 15000-5:2014 Part 5: Core Components Specification (CCS)
 ISO 15001:2010 Anaesthetic and respiratory equipment – Compatibility with oxygen
 ISO 15002:2008 Flow-metering devices for connection to terminal units of medical gas pipeline systems
 ISO 15004 Ophthalmic instruments – Fundamental requirements and test methods
 ISO 15004-1:2006 Part 1: General requirements applicable to all ophthalmic instruments
 ISO 15004-2:2007 Part 2: Light hazard protection
 ISO 15006:2011 Road vehicles – Ergonomic aspects of transport information and control systems – Specifications for in-vehicle auditory presentation
 ISO 15010:1998 Disposable hanging devices for transfusion and infusion bottles – Requirements and test methods
 ISO 15016:2015 Ships and marine technology - Guidelines for the assessment of speed and power performance by analysis of speed trial data
 ISO/IEC 15018:2004 Information technology - Generic cabling for homes
 ISO 15022 Securities – Scheme for messages (Data Field Dictionary)
 ISO/IEC 15026 Systems and software engineering—Systems and software assurance
 ISO/IEC 15026-1:2013 Part 1: Concepts and vocabulary
 ISO/IEC 15026-2:2011 Part 2: Assurance case
 ISO/IEC 15026-3:2015 Part 3: System integrity levels
 ISO/IEC 15026-4:2012 Part 4: Assurance in the life cycle
 ISO 15031 Road vehicles – Communication between vehicle and external equipment for emissions-related diagnostics
 ISO 15031-2:2010 Part 2: Guidance on terms, definitions, abbreviations and acronyms
 ISO 15032:2000 Prostheses – Structural testing of hip units
 ISO/IEC 15041:1997 Information technology - Data interchange on 90 mm optical disk cartridges - Capacity: 640 Mbytes per cartridge
 ISO/IEC TR 15044:2000 Information technology - Terminology for the Home Electronic System (HES)
 ISO/IEC 15045 Information technology - Home Electronic System (HES) gateway
 ISO/IEC 15045-1:2004 Part 1: A residential gateway model for HES
 ISO/IEC 15045-2:2012 Part 2: Modularity and protocol
 ISO/IEC 15049:1997 Information technology – Telecommunications and information exchange between systems – Private Integrated Services Network – Specification, functional model and information flows – Advice of charge supplementary services
 ISO/IEC 15050:2003 Information technology – Telecommunications and information exchange between systems – Private Integrated Services Network – Inter-exchange signalling protocol – Advice Of Charge supplementary services
 ISO/IEC 15051:2003 Information technology – Telecommunications and information exchange between systems – Private Integrated Services Network – Specification, functional model and information flows – Recall supplementary service
 ISO/IEC 15052:2003 Information technology – Telecommunications and information exchange between systems – Private Integrated Services Network – Inter-exchange signalling protocol – Recall supplementary service
 ISO/IEC 15053:2003 Information technology – Telecommunications and information exchange between systems – Private Integrated Services Network – Specification, functional model and information flows – Call Interception additional network feature
 ISO/IEC 15054:2003 Information technology – Telecommunications and information exchange between systems – Private Integrated Services Network – Inter-exchange signalling protocol – Call Interception additional network feature
 ISO/IEC 15055:1997 Information technology – Telecommunications and information exchange between systems – Private Integrated Services Network – Specification, functional model and information flows – Transit counter additional network feature
 ISO/IEC 15056:1997 Information technology – Telecommunications and information exchange between systems – Private Integrated Services Network – Inter-exchange signalling protocol – Transit counter additional network feature
 ISO/IEC 15067 Information technology - Home Electronic System (HES) application model
 ISO/IEC TR 15067-2:1997 Part 2: Lighting model for HES
 ISO/IEC 15067-3:2012 Part 3: Model of a demand-response energy management system for HES
 ISO/IEC TR 15067-3-2:2016 Part 3-2: GridWise interoperability context-setting framework
 ISO/IEC TR 15067-4:2001 Part 4: Security System for HES
 ISO 15075:2003 Transport information and control systems – In-vehicle navigation systems – Communications message set requirements
 ISO 15081:2011 Agricultural equipment - Graphical symbols for pressurized irrigation systems
 ISO 15082 Road vehicles – Tests for rigid plastic safety glazing materials
 ISO 15086 Hydraulic fluid power – Determination of the fluid-borne noise characteristics of components and systems
 ISO 15086-1:2001 Part 1: Introduction
 ISO 15086-2:2000 Part 2: Measurement of the speed of sound in a fluid in a pipe
 ISO 15086-3:2008 Part 3: Measurement of hydraulic impedance
 ISO 15099 Thermal performance of windows, doors and shading devices – Detailed calculations
 ISO 15112 Natural gas – Energy determination
 ISO 15118 Road vehicles - Vehicle to grid communication interface
 ISO 15137:2005 Self-adhesive hanging devices for infusion bottles and injection vials – Requirements and test methods
 ISO 15142 Implants for surgery – Metal intramedullary nailing systems
 ISO 15142-1:2003 Part 1: Intramedullary nails
 ISO 15142-2:2003 Part 2: Locking components
 ISO 15142-3:2003 Part 3: Connection devices and reamer diameter measurements
 ISO 15143 Earth-moving machinery and mobile road construction machinery – Worksite data exchange
 ISO 15143-1:2010 Part 1: System architecture
 ISO 15143-2:2010 Part 2: Data dictionary
 ISO/TS 15143-3:2016 Part 3: Telematics data
 ISO/IEC 15145:1997 Information technology - Programming languages - FORTH
 ISO/IEC 15149:2011 Information technology – Telecommunications and information exchange between systems – Magnetic field area network (MFAN)
 ISO/IEC 15149-1:2014 Part 1: Air interface
 ISO/IEC 15149-2:2015 Part 2: In-band Control Protocol for Wireless Power Transfer
 ISO/IEC 15149-3:2016 Part 3: Relay Protocol for Extended Range
 ISO/IEC 15149-4:2016 Part 4: Security Protocol for Authentication
 ISO 15174:2012 Milk and milk products – Microbial coagulants – Determination of total milk-clotting activity
 ISO 15188:2001 Project management guidelines for terminology standardization
 ISO 15189:2012 Medical laboratories – Particular requirements for quality and competence
 ISO/IEC 15200:1996 Information technology - Adaptive Lossless Data Compression algorithm (ALDC)
 ISO/IEC 15205:2000 SBus - Chip and module interconnect bus
 ISO 15212 Oscillation-type density meters
 ISO 15212-1:1998 Part 1: Laboratory instruments
 ISO 15212-2:2002 Part 2: Process instruments for homogeneous liquids
 ISO 15213:2003 Microbiology of food and animal feeding stuffs – Horizontal method for the enumeration of sulfite-reducing bacteria growing under anaerobic conditions
 ISO 15214:1998 Microbiology of food and animal feeding stuffs – Horizontal method for the enumeration of mesophilic lactic acid bacteria – Colony-count technique at 30 degrees C
 ISO 15216 Microbiology of the food chain - Horizontal method for determination of hepatitis A virus and norovirus using real-time RT-PCR
 ISO 15216-1:2017 Part 1: Method for quantification
 ISO/TS 15216-2:2013 Part 2: Method for qualitative detection
 ISO 15223 Medical devices – Symbols to be used with medical device labels, labelling, and information to be supplied
 ISO 15223-1:2016 Part 1: General requirements
 ISO 15223-2:2010 Part 2: Symbol development, selection and validation
 ISO 15225:2016 Medical devices – Quality management – Medical device nomenclature data structure
 ISO 15226:1999 Technical product documentation – Life cycle model and allocation of documents
 ISO 15230:2007 Mechanical vibration and shock – Coupling forces at the man–machine interface for hand-transmitted vibration
 ISO/TR 15235:2001 Preparation of steel substrates before application of paints and related products - Collected information on the effect of levels of water-soluble salt contamination
 ISO 15241:2012 Rolling bearings - Symbols for physical quantities
 ISO 15253:2000 Ophthalmic optics and instruments – Optical devices for enhancing low vision
 ISO 15254:2009 Ophthalmic optics and instruments – Electro-optical devices for enhancing low vision
 ISO 15261:2004 Vibration and shock generating systems - Vocabulary
 ISO/IEC TR 15285:1998 Information technology - An operational model for characters and glyphs
 ISO/IEC 15286:1999 Information technology - 130 mm optical disk cartridges for information interchange - Capacity: 5,2 Gbytes per cartridge
 ISO/IEC/IEEE 15288:2015 Systems and software engineering – System life cycle processes
 ISO/IEC/IEEE 15289:2017 Systems and software engineering – Content of life-cycle information items (documentation)
 ISO/IEC 15291:1999 Information technology – Programming languages – Ada Semantic Interface Specification (ASIS)
 ISO/IEC TR 15294:2000 Information technology – Methods for data flow control at synchronous and asynchronous DTE-DCE interfaces
 ISO 15296:2004 Gas welding equipment - Vocabulary - Terms used for gas welding equipment
 ISO/TR 15300:2001 Dentistry - Application of OSI clinical codification to the classification and coding of dental products
 ISO/IEC 15307:1997 Information technology – Data interchange on 12,7 mm 128-track magnetic tape cartridges – DLT 4 format
 ISO 15309:2013 Implants for surgery – Differential scanning calorimetry of poly ether ether ketone (PEEK) polymers and compounds for use in implantable medical devices
 ISO/PAS 15339 Graphic technology - Printing from digital data across multiple technologies
 ISO/PAS 15339-1:2015 Part 1: Principles
 ISO/PAS 15339-2:2015 Part 2: Characterized reference printing conditions, CRPC1-CRPC7
 ISO 15367 Lasers and laser-related equipment - Test methods for determination of the shape of a laser beam wavefront
 ISO 15367-1:2003 Part 1: Terminology and fundamental aspects
 ISO 15367-2:2005 Part 2: Shack-Hartmann sensors
 ISO 15368:2001 Optics and optical instruments - Measurement of reflectance of plane surfaces and transmittance of plane parallel elements
 ISO 15374:1998 Implants for surgery – Requirements for production of forgings
 ISO 15375:2010 Medical infusion bottles – Suspension devices for multiple use – Requirements and test methods
 ISO/TR 15377:2007 Measurement of fluid flow by means of pressure-differential devices – Guidelines for the specification of orifice plates, nozzles and Venturi tubes beyond the scope of ISO 5167
 ISO 15378:2017 Primary packaging materials for medicinal products – Particular requirements for the application of ISO 9001:2015, with reference to good manufacturing practice (GMP)
 ISO 15394:2009 Packaging - Bar code and two-dimensional symbols for shipping, transport and receiving labels
 ISO 15403 Natural gas – Natural gas for use as a compressed fuel for vehicles
 ISO 15403-1:2006 Part 1: Designation of the quality
 ISO/TR 15403-2:2006 Part 2: Specification of the quality
 ISO/IEC 15404:2000 Information technology – Office machines – Minimum information to be included in specification sheets – Facsimile equipment
 ISO/IEC 15408 Information technology – Security techniques – Evaluation criteria for IT security
 ISO/IEC 15408-1:2009 Part 1: Introduction and general model
 ISO/IEC 15408-2:2008 Part 2: Security functional components
 ISO/IEC 15408-3:2008 Part 3: Security assurance components
 ISO/IEC TR 15410:1998 Information technology – Telecommunications and information exchange between systems – PISN mobility-general principles and services aspects
 ISO/IEC 15411:1999 Information technology - Segmented keyboard layouts
 ISO/IEC 15412:1999 Information technology - Portable computer keyboard layouts
 ISO/IEC TR 15413:2001 Information technology - Font services - Abstract service definition
 ISO/IEC 15414:2015 Information technology - Open data processing - Reference Model - Enterprise Language
 ISO/IEC 15415:2011 Information technology - Automatic identification and data capture techniques - Bar code symbol print quality test specification - Two-dimensional symbols
 ISO/IEC 15416:2016 Automatic identification and data capture techniques - Bar code print quality test specification - Linear symbols
 ISO/IEC 15417:2007 Information technology - Automatic identification and data capture techniques - Code 128 bar code symbology specification
 ISO/IEC 15418:2016 Information technology - Automatic identification and data capture techniques - GS1 Application Identifiers and ASC MH10 Data Identifiers and maintenance
 ISO/IEC 15419:2009 Information technology - Automatic identification and data capture techniques - Bar code digital imaging and printing performance testing
 ISO/IEC 15420:2009 Information technology - Automatic identification and data capture techniques - EAN/UPC bar code symbology specification
 ISO/IEC 15421:2010 Information technology - Automatic identification and data capture techniques - Bar code master test specifications
 ISO/IEC 15423:2009 Information technology - Automatic identification and data capture techniques - Bar code scanner and decoder performance testing
 ISO/IEC 15424:2008 Information technology - Automatic identification and data capture techniques - Data Carrier Identifiers (including Symbology Identifiers)
 ISO/IEC 15426 Information technology - Automatic identification and data capture techniques - Bar code verifier conformance specification
 ISO/IEC 15426-1:2006 Part 1: Linear symbols
 ISO/IEC 15426-2:2015 Part 2: Two-dimensional symbols
 ISO/IEC 15428:1999 Information technology – Telecommunications and information exchange between systems – Private Integrated Services Network – Specification, functional model and information flows – Wireless Terminal Location Registration supplementary service and Wireless Terminal Information Exchange additional network feature
 ISO/IEC 15429:2003 Information technology – Telecommunications and information exchange between systems – Private Integrated Services Network – Inter-exchange signalling protocol – Wireless Terminal Location Registration supplementary service and Wireless Terminal Information exchange additional network feature
 ISO/IEC 15430:1999 Information technology – Telecommunications and information exchange between systems – Private Integrated Services Network – Specification, functional model and information flows – Wireless terminal call handling additional network features
 ISO/IEC 15431:2003 Information technology – Telecommunications and information exchange between systems – Private Integrated Services Network – Inter-exchange signalling protocol – Wireless terminal call handling additional network features
 ISO/IEC 15432:1999 Information technology – Telecommunications and information exchange between systems – Private Integrated Services Network – Specification, functional model and information flows – Wireless Terminal Authentication supplementary services (WTAT and WTAN)
 ISO/IEC 15433:2003 Information technology – Telecommunications and information exchange between systems – Private Integrated Services Network – Inter-exchange signalling protocol – Wireless Terminal Authentication supplementary services
 ISO/IEC 15434:2006 Information technology – Automatic identification and data capture techniques – Syntax for high-capacity ADC media
 ISO/IEC 15437:2001 Information technology - Enhancements to LOTOS (E-LOTOS)
 ISO/IEC 15438:2015 Information technology - Automatic identification and data capture techniques - PDF417 bar code symbology specification
 ISO/IEC TR 15440:2016 Information technology - Future keyboards and other input devices and entry methods
 ISO/IEC TR 15443 Information technology - Security techniques - Security assurance framework
 ISO/IEC TR 15443-1:2012 Part 1: Introduction and concepts
 ISO/IEC TR 15443-2:2012 Part 2: Analysis
 ISO/IEC 15444 Information technology – JPEG 2000 image coding system
 ISO/IEC 15444-1:2016 Core coding system
 ISO/IEC 15444-2:2004 Extensions
 ISO/IEC 15444-3:2007 Motion JPEG 2000
 ISO/IEC 15444-4:2004 Conformance testing
 ISO/IEC 15444-5:2015 Reference software
 ISO/IEC 15444-6:2013 Part 6: Compound image file format
 ISO/IEC 15444-8:2007 Secure JPEG 2000
 ISO/IEC 15444-9:2005 Interactivity tools, APIs and protocols
 ISO/IEC 15444-10:2011 Extensions for three-dimensional data
 ISO/IEC 15444-11:2007 Wireless
 ISO/IEC 15444-12:2015 Part 12: ISO base media file format [Withdrawn, no replacement]
 ISO/IEC 15444-13:2008 An entry level JPEG 2000 encoder
 ISO/IEC 15444-14:2013 Part 14: XML representation and reference
 ISO/IEC 15445:2000 Information technology – Document description and processing languages – HyperText Markup Language (HTML)
 ISO/IEC TR 15446:2009 Information technology - Security techniques - Guide for the production of Protection Profiles and Security Targets
 ISO/IEC 15457 Identification cards – Thin flexible cards
 ISO/IEC 15457-1:2008 Part 1: Physical characteristics
 ISO/IEC 15457-2:2007 Part 2: Magnetic recording technique
 ISO/IEC 15457-3:2008 Part 3: Test methods
 ISO/IEC 15459 Information technology - Automatic identification and data capture techniques - Unique identification
 ISO/IEC 15459-1:2014 Part 1: Individual transport units
 ISO/IEC 15459-2:2015 Part 2: Registration procedures
 ISO/IEC 15459-3:2014 Part 3: Common rules
 ISO/IEC 15459-4:2014 Part 4: Individual products and product packages
 ISO/IEC 15459-5:2014 Part 5: Individual returnable transport items (RTIs)
 ISO/IEC 15459-6:2014 Part 6: Groupings
 ISO 15469:2004 Spatial distribution of daylight – CIE standard general sky
 ISO/IEC 15474 Information technology - CDIF framework
 ISO/IEC 15474-1:2002 Part 1: Overview
 ISO/IEC 15474-2:2002 Part 2: Modelling and extensibility
 ISO/IEC 15475 Information technology - CDIF transfer format
 ISO/IEC 15475-1:2002 Part 1: General rules for syntaxes and encodings
 ISO/IEC 15475-2:2002 Part 2: Syntax SYNTAX.1
 ISO/IEC 15475-3:2002 Part 3: Encoding ENCODING.1
 ISO/IEC 15476 Information technology - CDIF semantic metamodel
 ISO/IEC 15476-1:2002 Part 1: Foundation
 ISO/IEC 15476-2:2002 Part 2: Common
 ISO/IEC 15476-3:2006 Part 3: Data definitions
 ISO/IEC 15476-4:2005 Part 4: Data models
 ISO/IEC 15476-6:2006 Part 6: State/event models
 ISO/IEC 15485:1997 Information technology - Data interchange on 120 mm optical disk cartridges using phase change PD format - Capacity: 650 Mbytes per cartridge
 ISO/IEC 15486:1998 Information technology - Data interchange on 130 mm optical disk cartridges of type WORM (Write Once Read Many) using irreversible effects - Capacity: 2,6 Gbytes per cartridge
 ISO 15489 Information and documentation – Records management
 ISO 15489-1:2016 Part 1: Concepts and principles
 ISO/TR 15489-2:2001 Part 2: Guidelines [Withdrawn, no replacement]
 ISO/IEC 15498:1997 Information technology - Data interchange on 90 mm optical disk cartridges - HS-1 format - Capacity: 650 Mbytes per cartridge
 ISO/IEC 15504 Information technology – Process assessment
 ISO/IEC 15505:2003 Information technology – Telecommunications and information exchange between systems – Private Integrated Services Network – Specification, functional model and information flows – Message Waiting Indication supplementary service
 ISO/IEC 15506:2003 Information technology – Telecommunications and information exchange between systems – Private Integrated Services Network – Inter-exchange signalling protocol – Message Waiting Indication supplementary service
 ISO/IEC 15507:1997 Information technology – Telecommunications and information exchange between systems – Private Integrated Services Network – Inter-exchange signalling protocol – PINX clock synchronization
 ISO 15511:2011 Information and documentation - International standard identifier for libraries and related organizations (ISIL)
 ISO 15519 Specification for diagrams for process industry
 ISO 15519-1:2010 Part 1: General rules
 ISO 15519-2:2015 Part 2: Measurement and control
 ISO/IEC 15521:1998 Information technology – 3,81 mm wide magnetic tape cartridge for information interchange – Helical scan recording – DDS-3 format using 125 m length tapes
 ISO 15529:2010 Optics and photonics - Optical transfer function - Principles of measurement of modulation transfer function (MTF) of sampled imaging systems
 ISO 15530 Geometrical product specifications (GPS) – Coordinate measuring machines (CMM): Technique for determining the uncertainty of measurement
 ISO/TS 15530-1:2013 Part 1: Overview and metrological characteristics
 ISO 15530-3:2011 Part 3: Use of calibrated workpieces or measurement standards
 ISO/TS 15530-4:2008 Part 4: Evaluating task-specific measurement uncertainty using simulation
 ISO 15553:2006 Water quality – Isolation and identification of Cryptosporidium oocysts and Giardia cysts from water
 ISO 15583:2005 Ships and marine technology - Maritime standards list
 ISO/TR 15599:2002 Digital codification of dental laboratory procedures
 ISO 15614 Specification and qualification of welding procedures for metallic materials – Welding procedure test
 ISO 15622:2010 Intelligent transport systems – Adaptive Cruise Control systems – Performance requirements and test procedures
 ISO 15623:2013 Intelligent transport systems – Forward vehicle collision warning systems – Performance requirements and test procedures
 ISO/TS 15624:2001 Transport information and control systems – Traffic Impediment Warning Systems (TIWS) – System requirements
 ISO 15628:2013 Intelligent transport systems – Dedicated short range communication (DSRC) – DSRC application layer
 ISO 15638 Intelligent transport systems – Framework for cooperative telematics applications for regulated commercial freight vehicles (TARV)
 ISO 15638-1:2012 Part 1: Framework and architecture
 ISO 15638-2:2013 Part 2: Common platform parameters using CALM
 ISO 15638-3:2013 Part 3: Operating requirements, 'Approval Authority' procedures, and enforcement provisions for the providers of regulated services
 ISO 15638-5:2013 Part 5: Generic vehicle information
 ISO 15638-6:2014 Part 6: Regulated applications
 ISO 15638-7:2013 Part 7: Other applications
 ISO 15638-8:2014 Part 8: Vehicle access management
 ISO/TS 15638-9:2013 Part 9: Remote electronic tachograph monitoring (RTM)
 ISO 15638-10:2017 Part 10: Emergency messaging system/eCall
 ISO 15638-11:2014 Part 11: Driver work records
 ISO 15638-12:2014 Part 12: Vehicle mass monitoring
 ISO/TS 15638-13:2015 Part 13: "Mass" information for jurisdictional control and enforcement
 ISO 15638-14:2014 Part 14: Vehicle access control
 ISO 15638-15:2014 Part 15: Vehicle location monitoring
 ISO 15638-16:2014 Part 16: Vehicle speed monitoring
 ISO 15638-17:2014 Part 17: Consignment and location monitoring
 ISO 15638-18:2017 Part 18: ADR (Dangerous Goods)
 ISO/TS 15638-19:2013 Part 19: Vehicle parking facilities (VPF)
 ISO 15642:2003 Road construction and maintenance equipment – Asphalt mixing plants – Terminology and commercial specifications
 ISO 15662:2006 Intelligent transport systems – Wide area communication – Protocol management information
 ISO 15664:2001 Acoustics – Noise control design procedures for open plant
 ISO 15665:2003 Acoustics – Acoustic insulation for pipes, valves and flanges
 ISO 15667:2000 Acoustics – Guidelines for noise control by enclosures and cabins
 ISO 15674:2016 Cardiovascular implants and artificial organs – Hard-shell cardiotomy/venous reservoir systems (with/without filter) and soft venous reservoir bags
 ISO 15675:2016 Cardiovascular implants and artificial organs – Cardiopulmonary bypass systems – Arterial blood line filters
 ISO 15676:2016 Cardiovascular implants and artificial organs – Requirements for single-use tubing packs for cardiopulmonary bypass and extracorporeal membrane oxygenation (ECMO)
 ISO 15686 Buildings and constructed assets – Service life planning
 ISO 15688:2012 Road construction and maintenance equipment – Soil stabilizers – Terminology and commercial specifications
 ISO 15689:2003 Road construction and maintenance equipment – Powder binder spreaders – Terminology and commercial specifications
 ISO/IEC 15693 Identification cards – Contactless integrated circuit cards – Vicinity cards
 ISO/TS 15696:2012 Cranes – List of equivalent terms
 ISO 15706 Information and documentation – International Standard Audiovisual Number (ISAN)
 ISO 15707:2001 Information and documentation – International Standard Musical Work Code (ISWC)
 ISO/IEC 15718:1998 Information technology – Data interchange on 8 mm wide magnetic tape cartridge – Helical scan recording – HH-1 format
 ISO/IEC 15731:1998 Information technology – 12,65 mm wide magnetic tape cassette for information interchange – Helical scan recording – DTF-1 format
 ISO 15744:2002 Hand-held non-electric power tools – Noise measurement code – Engineering method (grade 2)
 ISO 15747:2010 Plastic containers for intravenous injections
 ISO 15752:2010 Ophthalmic instruments – Endoilluminators – Fundamental requirements and test methods for optical radiation safety
 ISO/IEC 15757:1998 Information technology – Data interchange on 8 mm wide magnetic tape cartridge – Helical scan recording – DA-2 format
 ISO 15759:2005 Medical infusion equipment – Plastics caps with inserted elastomeric liner for containers manufactured by the blow-fill-seal (BFS) process
 ISO/TS 15768:2000 Measurement of liquid velocity in open channels – Design, selection and use of electromagnetic current meters
 ISO 15769:2010 Hydrometry – Guidelines for the application of acoustic velocity meters using the Doppler and echo correlation methods
 ISO/IEC 15771:1998 Information technology – Telecommunications and information exchange between systems – Private Integrated Services Network – Specification, functional model and information flows – Common information additional network feature
 ISO/IEC 15772:2003 Information technology – Telecommunications and information exchange between systems – Private Integrated Services Network – Inter-exchange signalling protocol – Common Information additional network feature
 ISO/IEC 15773:1998 Information technology – Telecommunications and information exchange between systems – Broadband Private Integrated Services Network – Inter-exchange signalling protocol – Transit counter additional network feature
 ISO/IEC 15776:2001 VME64bus - Specification
 ISO/IEC 15780:1998 Information technology – 8 mm wide magnetic tape cartridge – Helical scan recording – AIT-1 format
 ISO 15782 Certificate management for financial services
 ISO 15782-1:2009 Part 1: Public key certificates
 ISO 15782-2:2001 Part 2: Certificate extensions
 ISO 15783:2002 Seal-less rotodynamic pumps – Class II – Specification
 ISO 15784 Intelligent transport systems (ITS) – Data exchange involving roadside modules communication
 ISO 15784-1:2008 Part 1: General principles and documentation framework of application profiles
 ISO 15784-2:2015 Part 2: Centre to field device communications using SNMP
 ISO 15784-3:2008 Part 3: Application profile-data exchange (AP-DATEX)
 ISO 15785:2002 Technical drawings – Symbolic presentation and indication of adhesive, fold and pressed joints
 ISO 15786:2008 Technical drawings – Simplified representation and dimensioning of holes
 ISO 15787:2016 Technical product documentation – Heat-treated ferrous parts – Presentation and indications
 ISO 15798:2013 Ophthalmic implants – Ophthalmic viscosurgical devices
 ISO/IEC 15802 Information technology – Telecommunications and information exchange between systems – Local and metropolitan area networks – Common specifications
 ISO/IEC 15802-1:1995 Part 1: Medium Access Control (MAC) service definition
 ISO/IEC 15802-3:1998 Part 3: Media Access Control (MAC) Bridges
 ISO/IEC 15816:2002 Information technology - Security techniques - Security information objects for access control
 ISO 15836:2009 Information and documentation – The Dublin Core metadata element set
 ISO 15836-1:2017 Part 1: Core elements
 ISO/TR 15847:2008 Graphic technology - Graphical symbols for printing press systems and finishing systems, including related auxiliary equipment
 ISO 15849:2001 Ships and marine technology – Guidelines for implementation of a fleet management system network
 ISO/IEC 15851:1999 Information technology - Communication protocol - Open MUMPS Interconnect
 ISO/IEC 15852:1999 Information technology - Programming languages - M Windowing API
 ISO 15867:2003 Intermediate bulk containers (IBCs) for non-dangerous goods – Terminology
 ISO 15870:2000 Powered industrial trucks - Safety signs and hazard pictorials - General principles
 ISO 15878:2008 Road construction and maintenance equipment – Asphalt pavers – Terminology and commercial specifications
 ISO/IEC 15895:1999 Information technology – Data interchange on 12,7 mm 128-track magnetic tape cartridges – DLT 3-XT format
 ISO/IEC 15896:1999 Information technology – Data interchange on 12,7 mm 208-track magnetic tape cartridges – DLT 5 format
 ISO/IEC 15897:2011 Information technology - User interfaces - Procedures for the registration of cultural elements
 ISO 15883-1:2006 specifies general performance requirements for washer-disinfectors (WD) and their accessories that are intended to be used for cleaning and disinfection of re-usable medical devices and other articles used in the context of medical, dental, pharmaceutical and veterinary practice.
 ISO/IEC 15898:1998 Information technology - Data interchange on 356 mm optical disk cartridges - WORM, using phase change technology - Capacity: 14,8 Gbytes and 25 Gbytes per cartridge
 ISO/IEC 15899:1998 Information technology – Telecommunications and information exchange between systems – Broadband Private Integrated Services Network – Service description – Broadband connection oriented bearer services
 ISO 15901-2:2022 Pore size distribution and porosity of solid materials by mercury porosimetry and gas adsorption — Part 2: Analysis of nanopores by gas adsorption
 ISO 15902:2004 Optics and photonics - Diffractive optics - Vocabulary
 ISO/IEC 15909 Systems and software engineering - High-level Petri nets
 ISO/IEC 15909-1:2004 Part 1: Concepts, definitions and graphical notation
 ISO/IEC 15909-2:2011 Part 2: Transfer format
 ISO 15919:2001 Information and documentation - Transliteration of Devanagari and related Indic scripts into Latin characters
 ISO 15924:2004 Information and documentation – Codes for the representation of names of scripts
 ISO 15926 - Integration of Life-cycle Data for Process Plants including Oil and Gas Production Facilities
 ISO 15927 Hygrothermal performance of buildings – Calculation and presentation of climatic data
 ISO 15927-1:2003 Part 1: Monthly means of single meteorological elements
 ISO 15927-2:2009 Part 2: Hourly data for design cooling load
 ISO 15927-3:2009 Part 3: Calculation of a driving rain index for vertical surfaces from hourly wind and rain data
 ISO 15927-4:2005 Part 4: Hourly data for assessing the annual energy use for heating and cooling
 ISO 15927-5:2004 Part 5: Data for design heat load for space heating
 ISO 15927-6:2007 Part 6: Accumulated temperature differences (degree-days)
 ISO 15930 Graphic technology – Prepress digital data exchange using PDF
 ISO 15932:2013 Microbeam analysis - Analytical electron microscopy - Vocabulary
 ISO/IEC 15938 Information technology - Multimedia content description interface
 ISO/IEC/IEEE 15939:2017 Systems and software engineering - Measurement process
 ISO/IEC 15940:2013 Systems and software engineering - Software Engineering Environment Services
 ISO/IEC TR 15942:2000 Information technology - Programming languages - Guide for the use of the Ada programming language in high integrity systems
 ISO/IEC 15944 Information technology - Business operational view
 ISO/IEC 15944-1:2011 Part 1: Operational aspects of open-edi for implementation
 ISO/IEC 15944-2:2015 Part 2: Registration of scenarios and their components as business objects
 ISO/IEC 15944-4:2015 Part 4: Business transaction scenarios – Accounting and economic ontology
 ISO/IEC 15944-5:2008 Part 5: Identification and referencing of requirements of jurisdictional domains as sources of external constraints
 ISO/IEC TR 15944-6:2015 Part 6: Technical introduction to e-Business modelling
 ISO/IEC 15944-7:2009 Part 7: eBusiness vocabulary
 ISO/IEC 15944-8:2012 Part 8: Identification of privacy protection requirements as external constraints on business transactions
 ISO/IEC 15944-9:2015 Part 9: Business transaction traceability framework for commitment exchange
 ISO/IEC 15944-10:2013 Part 10: IT-enabled coded domains as semantic components in business transactions
 ISO/IEC 15944-20:2015 Part 20: Linking business operational view to functional service view
 ISO/IEC 15945:2002 Information technology - Security techniques - Specification of TTP services to support the application of digital signatures
 ISO/IEC 15946 Information technology - Security techniques - Cryptographic techniques based on elliptic curves
 ISO/IEC 15946-1:2016 Part 1: General
 ISO/IEC 15946-5:2017 Part 5: Elliptic curve generation
 ISO/IEC 15948 Information technology – Computer graphics and image processing – Portable Network Graphics (PNG): Functional specification
 ISO/IEC 15953:1999 Information technology – Open Systems Interconnection – Service definition for the Application Service Object Association Control Service Element
 ISO/IEC 15954:1999 Information technology – Open Systems Interconnection – Connection-mode protocol for the Application Service Object Association Control Service Element
 ISO/IEC 15955:1999 Information technology – Open Systems Interconnection – Connectionless protocol for the Application Service Object Association Control Service Element
 ISO/IEC 15961 Information technology - Radio frequency identification (RFID) for item management: Data protocol
 ISO/IEC 15961-1:2013 Part 1: Application interface
 ISO/IEC 15961-4:2016 Part 4: Application interface commands for battery assist and sensor functionality
 ISO/IEC 15962:2013 Information technology - Radio frequency identification (RFID) for item management - Data protocol: data encoding rules and logical memory functions
 ISO/IEC 15963:2009 Information technology - Radio frequency identification for item management - Unique identification for RF tags
 ISO 15970 Natural gas – Measurement of properties – Volumetric properties: density, pressure, temperature and compression factor
 ISO 15971:2008 Natural gas – Measurement of properties – Calorific value and Wobbe index
 ISO 15985:2004 Plastics – Determination of the ultimate anaerobic biodegradation and disintegration under high-solids anaerobic-digestion conditions – Method by analysis of released biogas
 ISO/IEC 15991:2003 Information technology – Telecommunications and information exchange between systems – Private Integrated Services Network – Specification, functional model and information flows – Call Priority Interruption and Call Priority Interruption Protection supplementary services
 ISO/IEC 15992:2003 Information technology – Telecommunications and information exchange between systems – Private Integrated Services Network – Inter-exchange signalling protocol – Call Priority Interruption and Call Priority Interruption Protection supplementary services

Notes

References

External links 
 International Organization for Standardization
 ISO Certification Provider
 ISO Consultant
ISO 14000

International Organization for Standardization